Admir Salihović (born 15 November 1989) is a Bosnian Canadian footballer who plays for EDC FC Burnaby in the Vancouver Metro Soccer League.

Career 
He is a talented, young player who can play on the left or right-hand side of midfield, he joins the Whitecaps after signing a one-year professional contract with the club. He holds dual citizen of Bosnia and Canada, he has received an invite to play for the Bosnia & Herzegovina U-21 side, but the midfielder has so far not taken the opportunity to play for the country of his birth.

In the summer of 2005, Salihović trained with Bosnian Premijer Liga club FK Željeznicar, which is based in the Bosnian capital of Sarajevo.

He moved from his hometown of Tuzla with his family to the Lower Mainland in 2000. The midfielder has been in the Bachelor of Business Administration (BBA) degree program at Langara College since the fall of 2006, he played 2004 with the Burnaby Selects. Salihović joined than in summer 2009 to Croatia and signed here 28 June 2009 a contract with HNK Šibenik.

He has just signed to TSV Hartberg on January 24, 2012 and has become TSV Hartberg's first signing in the winter transfer window. TSV Hartberg is an Austrian Association Football club based in Hartberg, founded in 1946, which is currently playing in the Austrian Football First League.

Personal life 
His parents are Fikreta and Osman Salihović, and he has an older brother named Alen, who was a former 400 and 800 meters track & field runner with Bosnian club FK Sloboda Tuzla.

References

External links 
 Official Facebook
 Admir Salihović | Hrvatska nogometna liga

Canadian soccer players
Association football midfielders
Vancouver Whitecaps Residency players
Vancouver Whitecaps (1986–2010) players
Living people
1988 births
Bosnia and Herzegovina emigrants to Canada
HNK Šibenik players
USL First Division players
USL League Two players
Langara College people